Sol de Inverno (Winter Sun) is a Portuguese telenovela which aired on SIC in September 2013 - September 2014.

Cast
 Maria João Luís - Laura Teles de Aragão
 Rita Blanco - Sofia Ferreira Bívar
 Rogério Samora - Manuel Gusmão
 Vitória Guerra - Matilde Bívar
 Pedro Sousa - Salvador Teles de Aragão
 Inês Castel-Branco - Teresa Teles de Aragão
 Diogo Morgado - Eduardo Teles de Aragão
 Cláudia Vieira - Andreia Teles de Aragão
 Ângelo Rodrigues - Simão Teles de Aragão
 Joana Ribeiro - Margarida Teles de Aragão
 João Perry - Adelino Ferreira
 Maria Emília Correia - Lurdes Fonseca
 Ana Marta Ferreira - Concha Vasconcelos
 Jorge Corrula - Tomás
 Teresa Macedo - Joana Ferreira
 Márcia Breia - Dulce Sousa
 Rui Unas - Carlos Miguel Sousa
 Luciana Abreu - Fátima Cardoso de Jesus
 João Ricardo - Acácio Cardoso de Jesus
 Diana Chaves - Lúcia Raposo
 Fátima Belo - Beatriz Ferreira
 Rui Morisson - Lourenço Branco Teles
 Dânia Neto - Benedita Lage
 Ana Nave - Isabel Lage
 Sandra Barata Belo - Rita Taborda
 Cleia Almeida - Célia Barata
 João Baptista (ator) - Fábio Pacheco
 Lia Gama -  Rosa Mendes
 Alexandre de Sousa - Horácio Mendes 
 Andreia Dinis - Ana Mendes
 Rui Neto - Nuno Mendes
 Duarte Soares - Artur Fonseca
 Júlio César - Jacinto Fonseca
 Francisco Côrte-Real - Vicente Pereira
 Ana Padrão -  Lé Vasconcelos 
 Filipe Vargas - Mariano Alvarenga
 Marco Delgado - Luís da Cunha
 Bárbara Lourenço - Inês Galego
 Leonor Beleza - Alice Tavares
 Francisco Monteiro - Vasco Gusmão
 Benedita Cardoso - Violeta Pereira 
 Miguel Ruivo - Matias Pereira

Plot 
Sofia Ferreira Bívar, 51 years old, and her husband, Alvaro Bívar, are partners of Laura Teles de Aragon, 53 years old, and her husband Francisco, in a company that owns the BOHEME.
The couples have a great friendship, working as a team, optimistic about the future of the company. They expand their brand worldwide.
This harmony, however, comes to an end when Sofia and her husband are accused of stealing company money and are forced to flee the country to avoid being arrested.
Laura is never related to the case, but she's the one who forges the evidence, implicating her partners, after being convinced Sofia had an affair with her husband, who dies in a water ski accident.
The circumstances of what happened lead Laura to access her husband’s inbox, where she discovers multiple e-mails to Sofia, in which Francisco confesses his love for her. Laura knows that Sofia and Francisco dated when they were young, so when she sees the emails, she comes to think they were lovers, despite the fact Sofia never gave in to her ex’s approaches.
Unable to overcome the jealousy and anger, she decides to fulfill a relentless punishment: contrary to the wishes of the children, she turns off the machine that connects Francisco to life and ruins Sofia’s life.

Caught unaware by accusations of fraud and on the verge of being arrested, Sofia and Álvaro find themselves forced to flee to Mozambique, where Alvaro lived during his childhood and still has many friends, leaving there family behind. In Africa, they will reconstruct their life from scratch. Sofia was always good with business, getting a Mozambican partner and opening a bakery that will grow, transforming into a chain of stores and distribution.
Her husband can’t take the pressure and commits suicide. When she is finally cleared of the crime of which he was accused, she returns to Portugal to recover what she lost and what was taken away from her…with interest!
The war against Laura, her former associate, is declared. The clash between these two women is about to start.

In a primarily female plot there are a handful of great women. Loaded with flaws and mistakes from the past without taking account of means of consequences, they do whatever it takes to achieve what they want. However, at the climax, there will only be room for remorse, for forgiveness and for justice.

References

2013 Portuguese television series debuts
2014 Portuguese television series endings
Portuguese telenovelas
2013 telenovelas
Sociedade Independente de Comunicação telenovelas
Portuguese-language telenovelas